A London Flat Mystery is a 1915 British silent crime film directed by Walter West and starring Vera Cornish, George Foley and Reginald Stevens. It is also known by the alternative title The Mystery of a London Flat. The screenplay concerns a Scotland Yard detective who believes two recent murders are linked and sets out to hunt down the killer.

Cast
 Vera Cornish - Margaret Forster
 George Foley - Bentley
 Reginald Stevens -  Bob Pritchard
 Constance Backner - Mrs Hooper
 Richard Norton - Bill Hooper
 Andrew Jackson - Leo Scott
 Hugh Croise - Inspector

References

External links

1915 films
1915 crime films
British silent short films
British crime films
Films directed by Walter West
Films set in London
British black-and-white films
1910s English-language films
1910s British films